Garage rock:  Frat rock is one of the earliest forms of garage rock and was popular in the 1960s, particularly in the first half of the decade.  The music tended to be "fun" and "upbeat" and was often played at parties and college fraternity events.